Bhabua is main city of Kaimur district in the state of Bihar, India. Bhabua is known for the famous historical temple Mundeshwari Temple and the Kaimur Range of hills. It is located 84 kms from Varanasi.

Geography 
The Buxar district of Bihar State and the Ghazipur district of U.P. State bound it on the North. On the south is the Garhwa district of Jharkhand State and on the West is the Chandauli and Sonbhadra districts of the U.P. State. On the East is Rohtas district of Bihar State on the bank of river suara.

Notable places  
Mundeshwari Temple  The Mundeshwari Devi Temple is located at an elevation of 608 feet on the Mundeshwari Hills of Kaimur plateau near Son canal, in the Indian state of Bihar. It is an Archaeological Survey of India protected monument since 1915.
Baidyanath Village is situated 9 km to the south of Ramgarh block headquarters. The village is home to a Lord Shiva temple that was built by the rulers of Pratihar dynasty. Numerous coins and others valuables of historical importance have been discovered here. According to archeologists, the temple was renovated in 812-13 AD.
Chainpur is situated 11 km to the west of Bhabua headquarters. there is the Hindu shrine of "Harsu Brahm", which famous for healing people affected from evil power.

Transport 

Bhabua Road railway station is the nearest Railway Station on the Howrah-New Delhi Grand Chord, which is about 14 km north from Bhabua town.
The main trains are Purushottam Express, Mahabodhi Express, Poorva Express, Kalka Mail, Mumbai Mail, Doon Express, Chambal Express, Shipra Express, Sealdah Exp, Budhpurnima Express, Asansol - Ahmedabad Express, Deekshabhoomi Express, Jodhpur Exp, Garib Nawaz Express, Ranchi - Varanasi Express, Jharkhand Swarna Jayanti Express, Sasaram - Anand Vihar Terminus AC Express etc.  The town is 195 km from Patna and 84 km from Varanasi by road.

NH 2 (G.T. Road) crosses through the center of the district from Karmanasha to Kudra for about 50 km. NH 30 originates from it near Mohania and connects this district with the capital Patna via Arah.  Apart from these, there are also a few State Highways in the district.

Mohania Sub-division is situated on Gaya-Mughalsarai Section of Grand Chord Railway line; the railway station is called Bhabua Road.  The district headquarters is 14 km south from the railway station and the G.T. Road.
The railway station has four platforms for the smooth flow of traffic.

See also
Sasaram

References 

Cities and towns in Kaimur district